XOS may refer to
 XOS.ro (website) unde puteti posta usor si rapid Anunturi Gratuite in toate categoriile, auto, imibiliare, angajari, electronice, casa si gradina, servicii etc in Romania

 XOS (operating system), an Android-based operating system
 XOS 3.0, 4.0, and 5.0, Red Hat Enterprise Linux derivatives
 XOS valuation, a kind of utility function used mainly in mechanism design
 Xbox One S, a video game console by Microsoft
 Xerox Operating System, an operating system for the XDS Sigma line of computers
 Xylooligosaccharide, a polymer of the sugar xylose

See also
 XDOS (disambiguation)